Banka, or Bankagooma, is a minor Mande language of Mali. There is a reasonable degree of mutual intelligibility with Duun.

References

Samogo languages
Languages of Mali